In signal theory, a signal element is a part of a signal that is distinguished by its:
duration,
magnitude,
nature (the modulation technique used to create the element),
relative position to other elements,
transition from one signal state to another.

The rate at which signal elements are sent is called the symbol rate and is measured in baud.  

Data transmission